David Batstone is an ethics professor at the University of San Francisco and is the founder and president of Not for Sale.

Batstone is also a journalist and the president and founder of Right Reality, an international business that engages in social ventures. He is a leader in Central American Mission Partners, a human rights group. As a representative of this group, he met with Bono through Glide Memorial Church during A Conspiracy of Hope, a concert tour in support of Amnesty International. Before becoming a human rights activist, Batstone was a Silicon Valley venture capitalist.

Biography
Batstone wrote the book Not for Sale: The Return of the Global Slave Trade - and How We Can Fight It, in which he wrote about human trafficking and how social inequality and poverty make it easy for traffickers to find girls to traffick. Julie Clawson wrote positively of this book, writing that she appreciated Batstone's "audacity in telling story after story of modern-day slavery." While still a student, Batstone studied under William R. Herzog, who taught Batstone about the parables of Jesus. Batstone is an advocate of workplace spirituality, about which he wrote in his 2003 book Saving the Corporate Soul. He is also a liberation theologian who considers postmodernity an era in which "we wallow in private affluence while squatting in public squalor." An anti-slavery activist, at the 2012 Freedom and Honor Conference in Korea, a conference about slavery and human trafficking, Batstone was one of the two keynote speakers.

Born in Illinois, Batstone graduated from Chillicothe Township High School in 1976. He then earned a B.A. degree in psychology from Westmont College in 1980. Batstone received an M.Div. degree from the International Baptist Seminary in Switzerland in 1982 and a second M.Div. degree from the Pacific School of Religion in 1984. He completed his Ph.D. degree in systematic theology at the Graduate Theological Union in 1989. His doctoral thesis in liberation theology was entitled From Conquest to Struggle: Jesus of Nazareth in the Liberation Christology of Latin America.

References

1958 births
Living people
Place of birth missing (living people)
People from Chillicothe, Illinois
Westmont College alumni
Pacific School of Religion alumni
Graduate Theological Union alumni
American ethicists
Christian ethicists
21st-century American writers
21st-century American philosophers
Writers from San Francisco
American business writers
Non-fiction writers about organized crime in the United States
20th-century American Roman Catholic theologians
21st-century American Roman Catholic theologians
American spiritual writers
American social sciences writers
Catholic philosophers
Philosophers of social science
Liberation theologians
American social commentators
American newspaper journalists
Journalists from California
American business and financial journalists
American male journalists
American activist journalists
Philosophy journalists
Religion journalists
Crime victim advocates
American human rights activists
American anti-poverty advocates
Anti–human trafficking activists
Activists from the San Francisco Bay Area
American humanitarians
American social activists
Businesspeople from the San Francisco Bay Area
21st-century American businesspeople
University of San Francisco faculty
Sociologists of religion
Philosophers from California